In October 2005 two soldiers were investigated for beating captives held in Forward Operating Base Ripley (now Multi National Base Tarin Kot), July 2005, in Uruzgan Province, Afghanistan. The two soldiers were Sergeant Kevin D. Myricks and Specialist James R. Hayes.

On January 30, 2006, Myricks and Hayes were found guilty of one count of conspiracy to maltreat and two counts of maltreatment in the beating of Afghani captives.  Myricks was reduced in rank to private, and sentenced to six months imprisonment. Hayes was reduced in rank to private, and sentenced to four months imprisonment.

David R. Irvine, a former Law Professor and retired Brigadier General compared Myricks sentence for beatings to the lack of charges against commissioned officers in earlier murder incidents.

According to the BBC News:

References

2005 in Afghanistan
Human rights abuses in Afghanistan